The 1999–2000 Slovenian PrvaLiga season started on 1 August 1999 and ended on 20 May 2000. Each team played a total of 33 matches.

League table

Results

Matches 1–22

Matches 23–33

Top goalscorers

See also
1999–2000 Slovenian Football Cup
1999–2000 Slovenian Second League

References
General

Specific

External links
Official website of the PrvaLiga 

Slovenian PrvaLiga seasons
Slovenia
1999–2000 in Slovenian football